Pai (पाई) or sometimes called Pahi (पाही) is a fish trap fabricated by using Thakal daantha (थाकलकॊ डाॅठ) and Beshram (बेश्रम)/byaye (व्याय)/ajambari (अजम्बरी) thoroughly knitting with rope to make large rectangular sheets suitable for the filtration of water and it is mainly famous in Tharu, Kumal  and Majhi communities of western Nepal. Knitted sheets of their desired length and width are fixed in river of sharp current with the help of strong and large wooden nails (Kila). This fish trap was very efficient and  logical tool for the ancient indigenous peoples- making them to become successful in fishing.
This fish trap looks like Greek symbol pi(Π). Indigenous people from near around villages of banghushree are still adopting this technique for fishing in West Rapti River.

Methods
The method using for this fish trap is filtration where fishes are considered as suspended solids, rectangular knitted sheets acts as a filter, large wooden nails as a rigid support for entire system. This method for fishing is only applicable for rivers which are free from derbies and other  suspended objects.

References

Fish traps